Adamou Allassane is a Nigerien Olympic middle-distance runner. He represented his country in the men's 1500 meters at the 1984 Summer Olympics. His time was a 3:56.43 in the first heat.

References 

1960 births
Living people
Nigerien male middle-distance runners
Olympic athletes of Niger
Athletes (track and field) at the 1984 Summer Olympics